The Sonowal Kachari are one of the indigenous peoples of the state of Assam in Northeast India. They are of Tibeto-Burman origin, and are closely associated with the other ethnic groups of Assam which are commonly referred to as Kachari.

The name Sonowal comes from the word 'Son' which means gold in Assamese.The traditional occupation of the Sonowal kacharis was gold panning, that is extracting gold from the riverbeds. The Kacharis those were appointed as gold-washers by the Ahom kings were organised into Sonowal Khel. These Kacharis came to be known as Sonowal Kacharis.

They are predominantly inhabitants of Dhemaji, North Lakhimpur, Tinsukia and Dibrugarh districts of Assam, along with pocket populations in Jorhat & Golaghat districts. The headquarters of the Sonowal Kachari Autonomous Council is at Dibrugarh.

Notable people
 Sarbananda Sonowal, politician and former chief minister of Assam (2016-2021)
 Jogendra Nath Hazarika, chief minister of Assam (1979)
 Pradan Baruah, Indian politician, former member of Assam Legislative assembly, MP of Lakhimpur Lok Sabha.
 Jogesh Das, prominent writer, recipient of Sahitya Academi Award
 Jitul Sonowal, singer, music director, composer, lyricist and entertainer in the field of Assamese music since 1992.
 Lohit Sonowal, inspector of Commando Battalion of Assam Police, awarded the Kirti Chakra military decoration

See also 
 Thengal Kacharis
 Sonowal Khel
 Kachari Kingdom

Notes

References

Printed sources

Internet

Tribes of Assam
Social groups of Assam
Bodo-Kachari
Ethnic groups in Northeast India